"This Is the House" is a 1982 song by the British new wave duo Eurythmics. It was their third single, and was included on the band's second album Sweet Dreams (Are Made of This).

Background 
Recorded in early 1982 on their own 8-track home studio in north London (financed with a personal bank loan rather than record company support), the single was commercially unsuccessful and failed to chart. No music video was made for the single.

In Australia, "This Is the House" was released in 1983, following the chart success of "Sweet Dreams (Are Made of This)" and "Love Is a Stranger".  The single was listed on the Kent Music Report chart as receiving 'significant sales reports' outside the top 100, for two consecutive weeks in September 1983.  The highest ranking "This Is the House" achieved on this list was fifth place.  On its second appearance on this list, the single charted alongside "Who's That Girl?"

The B-side of the 7" single is entitled "Home Is Where The Heart Is", which was exclusive to this single until 2005 when it was released on the remastered CD of the Sweet Dreams (Are Made Of This) album.

The 12-inch single featured an extended remix of "This Is The House", plus four live tracks. This extended mix, plus the live version of "Your Time Will Come", were omitted from SonyBMG's 2005 remastered releases of Eurythmics' back catalogue, and remain unavailable on CD. However, the live versions of "Never Gonna Cry Again", "4/4 in Leather" and "Take Me To Your Heart" were included on SonyBMG's 2005 remastered release of the In The Garden album.

Track listing 
7"
 A: "This Is The House"  – 4:02
 B: "Home Is Where The Heart Is" (non-LP track) – 3:03

12"
 "This is the House" (extended remix) – 6:11
 "Your Time Will Come" (live) – 7:18
 "Never Gonna Cry Again" (live) – 4:36
 "4/4 in Leather" (live) – 3:05
 "Take Me to Your Heart" (live) – 5:00

Personnel

"This is the House" 
 Annie Lennox: vocals
 Dave Stewart: synthesisers & sequencers, backing vocals
 Andy Brown: bass guitar
 Reynard Falconer: bass section synthesisers
 Dick Cuthell: horns
 John Turnbull: guitar
 Adam Williams: backing vocals
 Maria Elvira Behro-García: South American girl
 Mercedes: special guest
 Chantal Arnaud, Nadine Masseron, Emily McLeod, Pauline Stride: street chorus

"Home is Where the Heart Is" 
 Annie Lennox: vocals
 Dave Stewart: synthesisers and sequencers
 Adam Williams: bass guitar

Live tracks 
 Annie Lennox: vocals, flute
 David A Stewart: double-neck electric guitar/bass guitar
 Tim Wheater: synthesizer, oriental flute
 Adam Williams: record (live & direct) and mix (On Stage)
 the other instruments were playing off backing tape.

References 

1982 songs
1982 singles
Eurythmics songs
RCA Records singles
Songs written by Annie Lennox
Songs written by David A. Stewart
Song recordings produced by Dave Stewart (musician and producer)